Rashmika Dilshan (born 10 October 1998) is a Sri Lankan cricketer. In April 2018, he was named in Dambulla's squad for the 2018 Super Provincial One Day Tournament. He made his List A debut for Dambulla in the 2018 Super Provincial One Day Tournament on 11 May 2018. Prior to his List A debut, he was named in Sri Lanka's squad for the 2018 Under-19 Cricket World Cup.

In August 2018, he was named in Colombo's squad the 2018 SLC T20 League.

References

External links
 

1998 births
Living people
Sri Lankan cricketers
Place of birth missing (living people)